Mohawk Trail Regional School is a school located on Route 112 in Buckland, Massachusetts, United States. The public school currently serves grades 7–12 for nine towns: Ashfield, Buckland, Charlemont, Colrain, Hawley, Heath, Plainfield, Rowe and Shelburne.

History
Mohawk opened in September 1967, at a construction cost of $2,705,000. Previously, middle school and high school students from western Franklin County, Massachusetts had attended smaller schools, including Sanderson Academy in Ashfield, Charlemont High School in Charlemont, Arms Academy in Shelburne, and Crittenden Junior High School in Buckland.

Administration
Mohawk Trail Regional School is led by principal Chris Buckland.

References

External links
 
 Mohawk Drama Website

Public high schools in Massachusetts
Public middle schools in Massachusetts
Schools in Franklin County, Massachusetts
Educational institutions established in 1967
1967 establishments in Massachusetts